"Honey, Honey" is a song by the Swedish pop group ABBA. It was released as the second single from their second studio album, Waterloo, after the success of the title track at the 1974 Eurovision Song Contest.

History
"Honey, Honey" was written by Björn Ulvaeus, Benny Andersson and Stig Anderson, with shared vocals by Agnetha Fältskog, Anni-Frid Lyngstad and Ulvaeus. Along with the English version, ABBA also recorded "Honey, Honey" in Swedish on January 30, 1974, at Metronome Studio, Stockholm.

This was the last official recording by the group in their own language, and was released as the B-side of the Swedish "Waterloo" single. In its English format, "Honey, Honey" was released with "King Kong Song" as the B-side.

Reception
"Honey, Honey" was released in several European countries, the United States, Australia & New Zealand, but not in the UK. ABBA's British record label, Epic Records, decided to release a remixed version of "Ring Ring" instead of "Honey, Honey". However, this single only reached No.32, and a cover version of "Honey, Honey" recorded by the act Sweet Dreams, featuring vocalist Polly Brown, hit the UK top 10.

"Honey, Honey" spent 4 months in the top 5 in West Germany and also reached the top 5 in Austria, Spain and Switzerland. In the United States, "Honey, Honey" was moderately successful compared to the group's later singles. It reached No.27 on both the Billboard Hot 100 and Adult Contemporary charts; the 1st ABBA single to reach the AC chart.

Cash Box called it "a sweet pop rocker, featuring tight harmonies and excellent production."  Record World said that "the Scandinavian rockers take on a gentle, caloric, self-penned side."

Track listing

Official versions
 "Honey, Honey" (English version)
 "Honey, Honey" (Swedish version)

Personnel
ABBA
Agnetha Fältskog – lead and backing vocals
Anni-Frid Lyngstad – lead and backing vocals
 Björn Ulvaeus – lead and backing vocals, rhythm guitar
 Benny Andersson – backing vocals, keyboards
Additional personnel and production staff
 Janne Schaffer – lead guitar
 Rutger Gunnarsson – bass
 Ola Brunkert – drums
 Martin Bylund, Anders Dahl, Gunnar Michols, Claes Nilsson, Åke Jelving, Inge Lindstedt, Alfred Pisuke, Sixten Strömvall, Harry Teike, Kryztof Zdrzalka – violins

Chart performance

Weekly charts

Year-end charts

Cover versions
 In 1974, British band Sweet Dreams which reached No. 10 in the UK and No. 14 in Ireland in 1974. In the U.S. the Sweet Dreams version debuted on the Hot 100 in Billboard two weeks prior to the ABBA original but ultimately lost out to the latter, the peak of the Sweet Dreams version being No. 68. In Canada, the song reached No. 59. Both the Sweet Dreams and ABBA versions of "Honey, Honey" also charted concurrently in Germany, with Sweet Dreams being the less successful with a No. 42 peak.  Record World said of this version that the song "gets a spirited British reading from a group combining the old Supremes sound with very contemporary well -tempered synthesizer."
 In 2001, a eurodance cover was recorded by the group Housecream.
 The song was covered as a duet by music artist John Klass and Singaporean actress Jamie Yeo.
 The movie adaptation of Mamma Mia! features the song being sung by actress Amanda Seyfried (as Sophie), with actresses Ashley Lilley (as Ali) and Rachel McDowall (as Lisa) on backup vocals.  As in the stage musical itself, the vocals in the bridge are replaced with an instrumental version. This recording made no. 61 in the UK singles chart dated 2 August 2008, and no. 50 on the Australian singles charts. Released on download sales alone, it was credited to simply 'Original Cast Recording'. In 2020, the version was certified Silver in the UK.

Appearances in other media
 Australian radio station 2GB's weekend rugby league sports show the Continuous Call Team uses the song as a parody in reference to Parramatta Eels player Fuifui Moimoi.

References

1974 singles
1974 songs
ABBA songs
Number-one singles in Sweden
Polydor Records singles
Songs written by Benny Andersson and Björn Ulvaeus
Songs written by Stig Anderson